The Fairly OddParents is an American animated television series created by Butch Hartman for Nickelodeon. The series follows the adventures of Timmy Turner, a 10-year-old boy with two fairy godparents named Cosmo and Wanda who grant him wishes to solve his everyday problems.

The series originated from shorts on Nickelodeon's animation showcase Oh Yeah! Cartoons that aired from 1998 to 2002. Due to their popularity, the shorts were later green-lit to become a half-hour series, which premiered on March 30, 2001. Originally, it ended on November 25, 2006, totaling five seasons and 80 episodes, but revived in 2008. Production of the series ceased again after Hartman left Nickelodeon in February 2018. It is Nickelodeon's second longest-running animated show, behind SpongeBob SquarePants (1999–present).

On February 24, 2021, it was announced that a live-action series was in development for Paramount+. The series The Fairly OddParents: Fairly Odder premiered on March 31, 2022.

Synopsis

Premise
The Fairly OddParents tells the story of a 10-year-old boy named Timmy Turner who is neglected by his parents and abused by his babysitter, Vicky. One day, he is granted two fairy godparents, Cosmo and Wanda, who grant his every wish to improve his miserable life. However, these wishes usually backfire and cause a series of problems that Timmy must fix. Earlier episodes of the series tend to revolve around Timmy trying to navigate his everyday life at home, at school and elsewhere in town with his friends, Chester and A.J., and occasionally his parents, while also trying to fix a wish gone awry and ultimately, learning a lesson in the end. Later in the series, Timmy wishes that Cosmo and Wanda would have a baby, whom they named Poof. Much later in the series, Timmy got a pet fairy dog named Sparky. Even later in the series, Timmy is informed that due to a shortage of available fairies, he must now share Cosmo and Wanda with his neighbor, Chloe Carmichael, who is essentially his polar opposite. Chloe loves sharing, animals, and everything that is ecologically friendly.

At the beginning of the series, Vicky was the main antagonist, but as the series progressed, many more villains were introduced, including Denzel Crocker, Timmy's crazed teacher who wishes to prove to the world that fairies exist; Francis, the school bully; Remy Buxaplenty, a young billionaire child with a fairy godparent named Juandissimo Magnifico, who is set on getting rid of Timmy's fairy godparents due to his immense jealousy towards him for having two fairy godparents compared to his one; Dark Laser, a parody of Darth Vader, who wants to destroy Timmy and the Earth; the Pixies, who are known to wield as much power as fairies, but they treat their magical powers like a business. The Pixies' primary goal is to take control of Fairy World and the Earth; the Anti-fairies, who are similar to the actual fairies, but with polar opposite personalities and character traits. Anti-fairies are also known for causing bad luck; and Norm the Genie, who hatches a plan to gain freedom from his lamp and get revenge on Timmy.

Setting
The Fairly OddParents is set in the fictional city of Dimmsdale, California. Dimmsdale has a sign on some mountains near the city that is a parody of the Hollywood Sign. In the episode "Vicky Loses Her Icky", the Mayor of Dimmsdale unveils the "Welcome to Dimmsdale – Nicest Town on Earth!" sign. However, at the end of the episode, the President of the United States changes the word "Nicest" to "Meanest". Dimmsdale appears to be average-sized, with a downtown containing large buildings, skyscrapers and a city hall, but also containing uptown areas with suburban residences (including the neighborhood where Timmy, his parents and his friends live) and businesses, such as Timmy's school; a hospital; a jail; a sports complex called the Dimmadome, which is named after its founder and owner, Doug Dimmadome, a man who owns a local TV channel and various restaurants and stores, as well as a park in the center of the city. Dimmsdale also appears to have rural farmland located outside of the city. The adults who live in Dimmsdale are notably moronic and often settle situations with things like angry mobs, but they do still manage to form a working and functioning society. In the episode "Which Witch is Which?" it was revealed that Dimmsdale was founded in the 1660s and named after a man called Dale Dimm.

When the show needs to, it switches its location to Fairy World, the home of the fairies, which is a floating world located on top of some clouds and colored with an abundance of pink and purple. Fairy World is depicted as a large metropolis with houses, streets, different kinds of buildings, and skyscrapers. Most buildings in Fairy World have crowns and stars above their roofs. The fairies have a civilization like that of humans, but with their primary source of power being magic, which also keeps their world afloat. A large rainbow acts as the bridge between Fairy World and the Earth, although the bridge seems to exist only for decoration since fairies teleport via magic to and from Earth. Fairy World is not actually a part of Earth but is depicted as a separate world in outer space located near Earth's orbit that can only be accessed by magic. Among the most notable landmarks in Fairy World is the glowing entrance sign on the other side of the rainbow bridge and the giant wand located in the center of Fairy World that powers the fairies' magic. Jorgen Von Strangle, who acts as the leader of the fairies and Fairy World, is an enormous and tough fairy with an Austrian accent, similar to that of Arnold Schwarzenegger. Jorgen personally dislikes Timmy at the beginning of the series but warms up to him over time.

Another location seen in the show is the city of Chincinatti, the home town of Timmy's favorite comic book superhero, the Crimson Chin. Other locations include the dark and twisted Anti-Fairy World, the dark counterpart of Fairy World where the Anti-fairies reside; the dull and gray metropolis of Pixies Inc., home of the Pixies; and Yugopotamia, another planet where Timmy's alien friend Mark Chang lived until the episode "New Squid in Town!" when Timmy invites Mark to live in the Dimmsdale junkyard in order to escape his evil fiancée, Princess Mandie.

Voice cast

 Tara Strong as Timmy Turner, Poof
 Daran Norris as Cosmo, Mr. Turner, Jorgen Von Strangle
 Susanne Blakeslee as Wanda, Mrs. Turner
 Grey DeLisle as Vicky, Tootie
 Carlos Alazraqui as Denzel Crocker
 Matthew W. Taylor as Sparky
 Kari Wahlgren as Chloe Carmichael

Recurring voice actors include Jim Ward, Rob Paulsen, Dee Bradley Baker, Tom Kenny, Eric Bauza, Jason Marsden, Jeff Bennett, Dionne Quan, Gary LeRoi Gray, Kevin Michael Richardson, Frankie Muniz, and Ibrahim Haneef Muhammad.

Throughout its run, celebrities who have guest starred on The Fairly OddParents include Adam West, Jay Leno, Norm Macdonald, Mary Hart, Chris Kirkpatrick, Alec Baldwin, Ben Stein, Jackie Mason, Jason Bateman, Laraine Newman, Gilbert Gottfried, Michael Clarke Duncan, Brendan Fraser, Patrick Warburton, Julie Chen, Gene Simmons, Paul Stanley, Tom Arnold, Dana Carvey, and Scott Hamilton.

Production history

Development and Oh Yeah! Cartoons (1997–2001)

Prior to the creation of The Fairly OddParents, Butch Hartman was working at Cartoon Network on Dexter's Laboratory and Johnny Bravo. In 1997, Fred Seibert contacted Hartman about pitching ideas for Seibert's new company, Frederator Incorporated, as a part of their Oh Yeah! Cartoons series which the studio was developing for Nickelodeon. Hartman initially declined the offer. Several months later, Johnny Bravo finished and Hartman decided to create his own series instead of going back to working for other studios.

Hartman started developing his own series by drawing a picture of a little boy who would become Timmy Turner. Hartman was originally going to name him Mike, after his brother Mike Hartman, but they had a fight that day, so Hartman named him after his other brother Timmy Hartman instead. Hartman wanted Timmy to be able to go anywhere because he never wanted to be stuck for a story transition. Hartman was originally going to give Timmy science powers, but decided against it due to Dexter's Laboratory having recently come out. Instead, he decided to give Timmy a magic friend. He drew Wanda first and then decided that she needs someone to talk to other than Timmy, and that was when he drew Cosmo. After coming up with the entire premise for the cartoon in about fifteen minutes, Hartman first pitched the idea to Hanna-Barbera and then to Cartoon Network, both of whom turned it down. Hartman then went back to Seibert at Nickelodeon and successfully pitched it to them for Oh Yeah! Cartoons.

While in early development, the series was titled The Fairy GodParents and then it was briefly changed to Oh My GodParents. Bill Burnett came up with the title The Fairly OddParents, which they ended up sticking with. Hartman originally created The Fairly OddParents as a seven-minute short film, which was one of the thirty-nine short cartoons created for Oh Yeah! Cartoons. Hartman made ten seven-minute short films of The Fairly OddParents in total for Oh Yeah! Cartoons, which aired on Nickelodeon from September 4, 1998, to March 23, 2001. Due to the success of the shorts, Nickelodeon decided to pick up The Fairly OddParents for a full-length series alongside fellow Oh Yeah! Cartoons: ChalkZone and My Life as a Teenage Robot. In 2000, Nickelodeon ordered seven 23-minute episodes for the series' first season, which premiered on March 30, 2001 (just one week after the final Oh Yeah! short) in the half-hour before fellow Nicktoon Invader Zim made its debut.

Unlike the later series, the animation in the original shorts is not as smooth and the designs are notably different (including Timmy's parents, Mr. and Mrs. Turner, who are only seen from the neck down with their faces hidden in the pilot episodes and appear to be more intelligent than they appeared to be in the proceeding series, yet still easily duped by Vicky's abhorrent actions). Other notable differences include Timmy Turner, who was voiced by Mary Kay Bergman in the Oh Yeah! shorts rather than Tara Strong in the series (Strong would dub over Bergman's dialogue in the Oh Yeah! shorts to establish better continuity). Cosmo is significantly more intelligent than he appears to be in the proceeding series while Wanda is shown to be ditzy. Vicky is also much less evil than in the current series; she also calls Timmy by his name as opposed to the more often used "twerp".

Original run (2001–2006)
Upon its premiere, The Fairly OddParents was immediately popular and quickly became the second-highest-rated children's program among kids ages 2–11 on both network and cable television, behind Nick's own SpongeBob SquarePants. The series managed to briefly steal SpongeBob'''s spot as the number one highest rated children's television program in mid-2003. The Fairly OddParents also attracted a wide audience, appealing to kids as well as to teenagers and adults, with 14.2 million kids 2-11 tuning in each week, 10.8 million adult viewers per week and was the number one series on television among tween audiences (9-14).

On January 24, 2006, Hartman announced on his forum that Nickelodeon had ceased production of the show. "The Jimmy Timmy Power Hour 3: The Jerkinators" is the fifth-season finale in production order and was intended to be the series finale, airing on July 21, 2006. However, Nickelodeon broadcast the episode "Timmy the Barbarian/No Substitute for Crazy" after "The Jerkinators" as the fifth-season finale in airing order, on November 25 of that year.

Revival (2007–2012)
On February 2, 2007, Hartman announced on his forum that Nick granted The Fairly OddParents twenty more episode slots, making sure the show resumed production. Later on July 7, 2007, a special titled 77 Secrets of the Fairly OddParents Revealed hinted that a new character would join the series.

After a one-year hiatus, Nickelodeon announced that they would begin the sixth season, which would consist of twelve episodes alongside the broadcast of a television film called Fairly OddBaby, which introduced a new character, a baby fairy named Poof, to the main cast of characters. A huge hit, Fairly OddBaby aired on February 18, 2008, and garnered 8.89 million viewers for its premiere; the rebroadcast of the film the following day garnered 4.82 million viewers, making it the number one and ninth most viewed cable broadcast respectively for the week of February 18–24, 2008.

Live-action films and end of the series (2011–2017)

To honor the tenth anniversary of The Fairly OddParents, a live-action television film titled A Fairly Odd Movie: Grow Up, Timmy Turner! premiered on July 9, 2011. The film is set 13 years after the animated series and stars Drake Bell as a 23-year-old Timmy Turner, who is trying his hardest not to grow up in order to prevent losing his fairy godparents, and Daniella Monet as Tootie, who has grown into a mature and beautiful activist with whom Timmy falls in love. The premiere of the movie attracted 5.8 million viewers and it was the top-rated television broadcast on cable networks for the week of July 10–16, 2011, and ranked as "2011's Top Original TV Movie on Basic Cable with Kids and Total Viewers".

The success of A Fairly Odd Movie: Grow Up, Timmy Turner! spawned two sequels: A Fairly Odd Christmas and A Fairly Odd Summer, which premiered on November 29, 2012, and August 2, 2014 respectively. Drake Bell and Daniella Monet reprised their respective roles in both of the sequels.

The ninth season of The Fairly OddParents began with a television special titled "Fairly OddPet", which premiered on March 23, 2013, and attracted 3.8 million viewers. The ninth season's official run began on May 4, 2013. Season nine introduced a new character, Timmy's pet fairy dog Sparky, to the show's main cast. Season nine contained twenty-six episodes, making it the longest season in the series. It is also the first season to be formatted in both high definition and widescreen.

The tenth season of The Fairly OddParents began with a special called "The Big Fairy Share Scare!", which introduced another new main character named Chloe Carmichael, Timmy's neighbor who he is forced to share Cosmo and Wanda with due to a fairy shortage. The tenth season aired from January 15, 2016, to July 26, 2017, on both Nickelodeon and Nicktoons. The visuals and lyrics for the theme song were changed for season ten in order to include Chloe; however, it still contained the same rhythm and melody as the original theme song. Also in season 10, the show's animation made the transition from traditional animation to Flash animation. The animation for season ten was done by Elliott Animation Studios in Canada, whereas all of the prior seasons were animated by Yeson Animation Studios in South Korea.

Episodes

The Adventures of Jimmy Neutron, Boy Genius crossover episodes

There have also been three tie-ins with special episode crossovers involving the Nickelodeon computer-animated series The Adventures of Jimmy Neutron, Boy Genius under the title "The Jimmy-Timmy Power Hour" (the first alone, the second and third with the subtitles "When Nerds Collide!" and "The Jerkinators!", respectively); the three main characters from Fairly OddParents meet with the main characters from Jimmy Neutron, Jimmy, Sheen, Carl, Cindy, and Libby, and often cross between each of their worlds of 2D and 3D animation.

Cancelled spin-off series and film
In 2004, Hartman revealed his intentions to make a Crash Nebula spin-off series. The pilot episode "Crash Nebula" was aired as part of the show's fifth season, with the pilot focusing on a young boy named Sprig Speevak (voiced by James Arnold Taylor), who meets various types of strange aliens as he attends a school in outer space, making a few friends and enemies. Nickelodeon decided not to pick up the series.

In 2006, Hartman stated that he was still confident and would try to get the spin-off greenlit in the future. He also wrote a script entitled Crash Nebula: The Movie for Paramount Pictures, but the film was canceled due to its similarities to Disney's Sky High. However, no other news for the Crash Nebula IP has been announced since then, with it remaining as a fictitious television series in The Fairly OddParents that Timmy Turner is a fan of. The episode in the fifth season adds an introduction where Timmy is excited for Sprig's origin story, with Cosmo and Wanda making wild guesses.

Live-action reboot series

On February 24, 2021, it was announced that a live-action reboot series was in development and debut on Paramount+. Hartman and Seibert will return as producers, while Christopher J. Nowak will serve as both executive producer and showrunner. The series started production in July 2021 and premiered on March 31, 2022.

Home media

Reception
Critical reception
Betsy Wallace from Common Sense Media gave the series 3 of 5 stars saying, “Nickelodeon airs some of the most creative and expertly animated cartoons on television, and it has another winner with The Fairly OddParents.”

Dennis Cass from Slate Magazine favorably compared the series' writing to that of Animaniacs and praised the series' broad appeal.

Awards and nominations

Other media

Video games
Four video games have been released based on the series. The first video game, The Fairly OddParents: Enter the Cleft! was released exclusively for the Game Boy Advance on November 6, 2002, in North America. The second video game, The Fairly OddParents: Breakin' da Rules was released for the Game Boy Advance, GameCube, PlayStation 2, Xbox, and Windows exclusively in North America on November 3, 2003. The third video game, The Fairly OddParents: Shadow Showdown was released for Microsoft Windows, GameCube, PlayStation 2, and Game Boy Advance on September 8, 2004, in North America. The fourth video game, Fairly Odd Parents: Clash with the Anti-World was released exclusively for the Game Boy Advance on October 17, 2005.

The show was featured in most Nicktoons crossover video games, including Nicktoons Basketball released for Windows PCs on September 11, 2004, Nicktoons: Freeze Frame Frenzy was released for the Game Boy Advance on September 20, 2004, Nicktoons Movin' was released for the PlayStation 2 on October 21, 2004, the 2005 video game Nicktoons Unite was released for the PlayStation 2, Game Boy Advance, GameCube, and Nintendo DS, Nicktoons Winners Cup Racing was released for Windows PCs on February 15, 2006, Nicktoons: Battle for Volcano Island was released for the PlayStation 2, Game Boy Advance, GameCube, and Nintendo DS on October 24, 2006, and Nicktoons: Attack of the Toybots was released for the Game Boy Advance, PlayStation 2, Wii, and Nintendo DS on October 23, 2007. The show was also featured in an arcade racing game, Nicktoons Nitro, released on November 10, 2009.

Timmy Turner and his alter ego, Cleft the Boy Chin Wonder, are playable characters in the official mobile game Nickelodeon Super Brawl Universe.

Theme park attractions

There are 3 attraction rides based the show in total at Nickelodeon Universe in American Dream and Mall of America. Fairly Odd Coaster, located in Mall of America and formerly known as Timberland Twister in 2004, is a spinning roller coaster themed to the show that opened in 2007. In American Dream, there are 2 attraction rides themed to the show titled Fairly Odd Airways, designed for toddlers, and Timmy's Half-Pipe Havoc, a half-pipe roller coaster suitable for all ages, both opened on October 25, 2019.

Broadcast and streaming
The show aired on the main Nickelodeon channel before moving to Nicktoons after September 16, 2016. From then until July 26, 2017, new episodes premiered on the Nicktoons channel. Since the series ended, reruns are sometimes shown on Nicktoons.

As of July 30, 2020, all seasons of the show are available on Paramount+. The first three seasons of the show are currently streaming on Netflix in the United States, as of April 2022.

Figurines and toys
In 2004, Palisades Toys released a line of collectible Fairly OddParents figures.

In 2012, a toy company called Jazwares released some Fairly OddParents'' figures and plushies as part of the Nicktoons toy line.

Popular culture in music
American rapper Desiigner premiered a track titled "Tiimmy Turner" on July 21, 2016, based on the character Timmy Turner.

References

External links

 
 The Fairly OddParents at Frederator Studios
 Production blog
 
 

 
2000s American animated television series
2000s American children's comedy television series
2000s Nickelodeon original programming
2001 American television series debuts
2010s American animated television series
2010s American children's comedy television series
2010s Nickelodeon original programming
2017 American television series endings
American children's animated comedy television series
American television series revived after cancellation
American television series with live action and animation
American flash animated television series
Animated television series about children
Annie Award winners
Emmy Award-winning programs
English-language television shows
Frederator Studios
Nickelodeon original programming
Nicktoons
Television about fairies and sprites
Television about magic
Television franchises
Television series created by Butch Hartman
Television shows adapted into films
Television shows adapted into video games
Television shows set in California